Nayarangadi is a little village in Kerala, India, about  from Kunnamkulam and  from Guruvayoor.

The name Nayarangadi means Nair's marketplace, implying that this village was once a marketplace for, or run by, the Nairs (a subdivision within the Hindu community).

St. Cyriac church is located at Nayarangadi. Vadakekad Panchayath buildings is located at Nayarangadi.

Juma Masjid Nayarangadi is located on the way to Vylathoor.

References

Villages in Thrissur district